The discography of a Japanese singer-songwriter Akiko Yano. The list includes materials recorded with other artists.

Albums

Studio albums
Solo albums

Collaborative albums

Live albums
Solo albums

Collaborative albums

Compilation albums

Singles
"Iro wa Konpeitō" (1977)
"Ike Yanagida" (1977)
"Gohan ga Dekita yo" (1980)
"Harusaki Kobeni" (February 1, 1981)
"Tadaima" (June 1, 1981)
"Ashita Koso, Anata" (November 25, 1981)
"Gomennasai Oh Yeah" (1982)
"Watashi no Nyanko" (1983)
"Ramen Tabetai" (August 5, 1984)
"Ai ga Tarinai" (1985)
"Hana no Yō ni..." (November 21, 1987)
"David" (October 21, 1990)
"Bakabon" (January 22, 1990)
"Super Folk Song" (June 1, 1992)
"Children in the Summer" (May 1, 1993)
"Subarashii Hibi" (May 1, 1994)
"Yume no Hiyoko" (July 1, 1994)
"Ai ga Areba? (Love Can't Be Blind)" (September 7, 1994)
"Omoide no Sanpomichi" (October 21, 1995)
"Harusaki Kobeni" / "Hitotsu Dake" (July 21, 1996)
"Cream Stew (The Stew)" (May 1, 1997)
"Home Sweet Home" (March 25, 1998)
"Oka o Koete" (April 22, 1998)
"Girlfriends Forever" (May 21, 1999)
"Hitoribocchi wa Yameta" (July 1, 1999)
"Dreaming Girl" (March 5, 2002)
"Atashinchi" (December 3, 2003)
"Presto" (February 1, 2006)
"Shiawase na Bakatare" (August 30, 2011)
"Konyara no Uta" (March 18, 2012)
"Rilakkuma no Watashi" (August 7, 2013)
"Ton Poo" (September 5, 2015)
"Soft Landing" (June 23, 2017)

References

Yano, Akiko
Pop music discographies